Chlorocypha hintzi is a species of jewel damselfly in the family Chlorocyphidae.

References

Further reading

 

Chlorocyphidae
Articles created by Qbugbot
Insects described in 1914